The 2005 NCAA Division II Men's Soccer Championship was the 34th annual tournament held by the NCAA to determine the top men's Division II college soccer program in the United States.

Early in the second half of the championship final Franklin Pierce striker, Chris Joyce, netted the ninth goal of his postseason career, which set a new Div. II tournament record for a single player. In the match's final 10 minutes, a pair of Fort Lewis goals broke a one-one tie, and the undefeated Skyhawks (22-0-1) vanquished the Franklin Pierce Ravens, 3–1. It marked the tenth time a team finished a Div. II season without a loss. The final and semi-finals were played at the Midwestern State University Soccer Field in Wichita Falls, Texas.

This was the first national title and second finals appearance for the Skyhawks, who were coached by Jeremy Gunn.

Bracket

Final

See also  
 NCAA Division I Men's Soccer Championship
 NCAA Division III Men's Soccer Championship
 NAIA Men's Soccer Championship

References 

NCAA Division II Men's Soccer Championship
NCAA Division II Men's Soccer Championship
NCAA Division II Men's Soccer Championship
Fort Lewis Skyhawks